The Wounded Philoctetes is a painting by the Danish painter, N. A. Abildgaard. It was painted in 1775.

Having received a five-year scholarship from the Royal Danish Academy of Fine Arts, Abildgaard stayed in Rome where he painted his interpretation of the hero Philoctetes who was wounded by a snake and left behind on a Greek island by his brothers in arms during the Trojan War.

References 

Danish paintings
1775 paintings
Nude art
Paintings in the collection of the National Gallery of Denmark
18th-century paintings in Denmark
Paintings depicting Greek myths